Pocket-sized computer describes the post-programmable calculator / pre-smartphone pocket-sized portable-office hardware devices that included the earlier DOS-based palmtops and subsequent Windows-CE handhelds, as well as a few other terms, primarily covering the 1980s through 2007.

Sometimes called Pocket-sized computing devices, they were a series of internally different  devices, and included Handheld ("Pocket-sized handheld computing device"), and the earlier-introduced Palmtop
("Pocket-sized palmtop computing device") and "pocket-sized palmtop computer." The New York Times used the term "palmtop/handheld."

The media called "the first computer that fits in your palm and weighs less than a pound" and its early day competitors a palmtop. Although the word "handheld" was used before Microsoft's 1996 introduction of Windows CE, a lawsuit by Palm, Inc pushed Microsoft's use of the new term Handheld PC.

Timeline summary
 1973 - The first portable computer, the MCM/70, was introduced. It weighed about 9 kg. 
 1975 - The second portable computer, the IBM 5100, was introduced. It weighed 50 pounds (24 kg).
 1977 - The original TRS-80 was introduced. It used an 8-bit Z-80 processor.
 1980 - The term Pocket computer began in 1980 with the popular acceptance of the oddly-named TRS-80/Tandy Pocket Computer. It was not a TRS-80, and was the first of 8 models named PC-1 through PC-8. The TRS-80 Pocket Computer PC-1 was a rebadged Sharp PC-1211. that used two 4-bit processors.
 1981 - The first IBM Personal Computer
 1989 - The first Palmtop PC, using a 16-bit X86 processor
 1996 - The first Handheld PC

Neither the Palmtop PC nor the Handheld PC were pocket computers. As late as March 1981 a "computer small enough to fit in a coat pocket" had yet to be introduced.

Market acceptance
The first hand-held device compatible with desktop IBM personal computers of the time was the DIP Pocket PC aka Atari Portfolio in 1989.  The term "Handheld PC" described the product first introduced in 1989 by Atari as "the first computer that fits in your palm and weighs less than a pound." The full version of the ad ran as eight pages  and showed the device in actual size, including one page topped by a hand placing an Atari Portfolio(tm) into a suit inner lapel pocket.

Other early models were the Poqet PC of 1989 and the Hewlett Packard HP 95LX of 1991. Other DOS-compatible hand-held computers also existed. Some handheld PCs use Microsoft's Windows CE operating system, with the term also covering Windows CE devices released by the broader commercial market.

Despite the arrival in the early 2010s of devices lacking keyboards, demand for used pocket computers remained strong. The PsiXpda Ultimate Pocket Computer from 2009; the GPD Win from 2016; the Gemini from 2018 and the eponymous GPD Pocket commercial offerings continue to supply this market while the crowd-funded open source hardware Pandora and Pyra maintain small-scale production and ongoing development.

A combination of price and size makes them useful both for business and education; they also target the "games" market.

Nomenclature
By the mid 1990s, the New York Times referred to these portable office devices as:
 Palmtop computer
 Handheld computer
 Pocket-size computer
 Palmtop PC
 Personal Digital Assistant (PDA)
 Personal Intelligent Communicator (PIC)

Pocket computer was another term used. Subsequently, another publisher's "10 awesome handheld computers from yesteryear" included "1991 - HP 95LX pocket computer" even though HP called it a palmtop and HPmueum called it a handheld PC. As recently as 2017, these terms were intermixed.

Comparison among alternatives
Early Palmtops, beginning with 
Atari's 1989 Portfolio, used Intel-compatible x86 processors and a mostly IBM-compatible PC architecture and BIOS. Their operating system was DOS-like.

By the late-1990s, non-Intel processors and other operating systems were used for some devices, using Microsoft's Windows CE operating system, even as the term Handheld was growing.

The term PC was helpful, since many Palmtop PCs and Handheld PCs came with some personal-computer, PDA and office applications pre-installed in ROM, and most of them could also run generic, off-the-shelf PC software with minimal if any modifications. Some could also run other operating systems such as GEOS, MINIX 2.0, Windows 1.0-3.0 (in Real mode only), or Linux.

Most palmtop PCs were based on a static hardware design for low power consumption and instant-on/off without a need to reboot. Depending on the model, the battery could power the device from several hours up to several days while running, or between a week and a year in standby mode. Combined with the instant-on/off feature, a battery would typically last from a week up to several months in practical use as PDA.

Handheld computer, Palm PC, Palmtop and Personal Digital Assistant (PDA) were used concurrently and almost interchangeably. to describe these pocket-sized computing devices.  The acronym PIM referred to Personal Information Manager, a similar type of device that often came with a stylus interface instead of a keyboard. None of these, at the time, were intended to replace the PC.

Non-Wintel (Palm-top/Palm-size/Pocket computer)
Not all of the pocket-sized hardware was/is used for Windows/Intel systems.

At one point the Windows CE market share was less than 10%. Terms used included:
 Internet tablets -or-
 Tablet computers.

Not all Windows-running devices had a keyboard. If they matched all of the hardware requirements except for lacking a keyboard they were known as:
 Windows Tablet PCs
 Windows CE Tablet PCs

A list of handheld/pocket Linux computers
Some of them ran/run Linux.

History
Each term had a role:

Palmtop PC

Palmtop PCs from 1989 through 1996 included:
DIP Pocket PC (DIP DOS 2.11, 1989)
Atari Portfolio (DIP DOS 2.11, 1989)
Poqet PC Classic (MS-DOS 3.3, 80C88, 1989)
Poqet PC Prime (MS-DOS 3.3, 80C88)
Poqet PC Plus (MS-DOS 5.0, NEC V30)
ZEOS Pocket PC (MS-DOS 5.0, 1991)
Sharp PC-3000 (MS-DOS 3.3, 1991)
Sharp PC-3100 (MS-DOS 3.3, 1991)
 Hewlett-Packard:
95LX (1991) - MS-DOS 3.22, NEC V20
 MS-DOS 5.0, 80186-compatible HP Hornet:
 100LX (1993)
 200LX (1994)
 1000CX (1995) 
 700LX (1996)

Handheld PC

The Handheld PC was a late 1990s hardware design for personal digital assistant (PDA) devices running Windows CE.  It provided the appointment calendar functions usual for any PDA.

The intent of Windows CE was to provide an environment for applications compatible with the Microsoft Windows operating system, on processors better suited to low-power operation in a portable device.

Originally announced in 1996, the Handheld PC was distinct from  the Palm-size, Pocket PC, or smartphone in that the specification provided for larger screen sizes as well as a keyboard.

Personal Digital Assistant (PDA)

Psion's 1984-introduced handheld palmtop device was the first Personal Digital Assistant (PDA). Two years later the Psion Organizer
 was followed by the Psion Organizer II and other pocket-sized computers.

Other, less expensive devices of this type were Palm Inc's Palm Pilot and various Pocket PCs running Windows CE. Their main era was the 1990s, and included the Apple Newton.

Personal Information Manager (PIM)

Both by goal and by marketing, the audience for the "Personal Information Manager (PIM)" was the individual, not the corporation. Market research showed that people "wanted a device that would straddle the telephone and computer."

Until the smartphones of the 2010s, the goal of what an AT&T study called "an intelligent cellphone" was still pending.

See also
 Sub-notebook, IBM- and x86- compatible, clamshell design, but larger than palmtop PCs
 Psion netBook, ARM-based clamshell design
 generic Netbook, IBM- and x86- compatible, legacy-free, clamshell design typically much larger than a pocket
 Ultra-mobile PC, IBM- and x86- compatible, legacy-free, not necessarily clamshell design
 Pen computing, using a pen/stylus rather than a keyboard, joystick or mouse
 ActiveSync, Application for synchronizing hand-held devices and Windows PCs
 Smartbook
 EPOC, operating system of Psion's x86 and ARM -based palmtops and pocket computers.
 Windows CE, one operating system of Palm-sized PCs.
 Windows Mobile, one operating system of Pocket PCs.
 HP Jornada, A line of Handheld, Palm-size and Pocket PCs.
 Atari Portfolio, the first (1989)
 Palm (PDA)

References

External links
  List of DOS based palmtop PCs]

Personal digital assistants
Handheld personal computers